UFC on ESPN: Vera vs. Sandhagen (also known as UFC on ESPN 43) is an upcoming mixed martial arts event produced by the Ultimate Fighting Championship that will take place on March 25, 2023, at the AT&T Center in San Antonio, Texas, United States.

Background
The event will mark the promotion's third visit to San Antonio and first since UFC on ESPN: dos Anjos vs. Edwards in July 2019.

A bantamweight bout between Marlon Vera and former interim UFC Bantamweight Championship challenger Cory Sandhagen is expected to headline the event. They were previously expected to headline UFC Fight Night: Andrade vs. Blanchfield, but were rescheduled to this event for unknown reasons.

Although it was not announced by the promotion, a rematch between Irene Aldana and former UFC Women's Bantamweight Championship challenger Raquel Pennington was originally rumored to headline this event. The pair previously met at UFC on ESPN: dos Anjos vs. Edwards, where Pennington won by a split decision.

Sean Brady and Michel Pereira were expected to meet in a welterweight bout. However, Brady pulled out in mid-February due to a torn groin and the bout was scrapped.

A featherweight bout between Alex Caceres and Nate Landwehr was expected to take place at the event. However, Caceres withdrew due to an undisclosed reason and was replaced by Austin Lingo.

Liang Na and Brogan Walker-Sanchez were expected to meet in a women's flyweight bout. However, Liang pulled out due to undisclosed reasons and Walker-Sanchez was moved to UFC Fight Night: Pavlovich vs. Blaydes a month later as a replacement against Iasmin Lucindo.

Fight card

Announced bouts 
Featherweight bout: Nate Landwehr vs. Austin Lingo

See also 

 List of UFC events
 List of current UFC fighters
 2023 in UFC

References 

 

UFC on ESPN
2023 in mixed martial arts
Scheduled mixed martial arts events
Events in San Antonio
2023 in sports in Texas
March 2023 sports events in the United States